Kamiya-chō-nishi is a Hiroden station (tram stop) on Hiroden Main Line and Hiroden Ujina Line, located in Kamiya-chō 2-chōme, Naka-ku, Hiroshima. To reach the station, take an underground pass through Kamiya-chō Shareo.

Routes 
From Kamiya-chō-nishi Station, there are four of Hiroden Streetcar routes.
  Hiroshima Station - Hiroden-miyajima-guchi Route
  Hiroden-nishi-hiroshima - Hiroshima Port Route
  Hiroshima Station - Eba Route
  Yokogawa Station - Hiroden-honsha-mae Route

Connections 
█ Main Line
 
Kamiya-chō-higashi — Kamiya-chō-nishi — Genbaku Dome-mae (Atomic Bomb Dome)

█ Main Line / █ Ujina Line
 
Genbaku Dome-mae (Atomic Bomb Dome) — Kamiya-chō-nishi — Hondori

Other services connections 
█ Astram Line
 Astram Line Connections at Astram Hondori Station
 Astram Line Connections at Astram Kenchō-mae Station

█ Bus Service Routes
 Bus Service Route Connections at Hiroshima Bus Center

Around station

Underground 
 Kamiya-chō Shareo

North 
 Hiroshima Bus Center
 Sogo
 ALSOK Hall
 Hiroshima Municipal Stadium
 Hiroshima Museum of Art

South 
 DEODEO head store
 Hiroshima Peace Memorial Park
 Hiroshima Peace Memorial
 Children's Peace Monument
 Hiroshima Kenmin Bunka Center
 Rijyo Kaikan Hotel

History 
 Opened as "" on November 23, 1912.
 Rebuilt and renamed as "Kamiya-chō-nishi" on November 1, 2001.

See also 
Hiroden Streetcar Lines and Routes
List of railway stations in Japan

External links

Hiroden Main Line stations
Hiroden Ujina Line stations
Railway stations in Japan opened in 1912